Coolie No.1 is a 1991 Indian Telugu-language romantic action film produced by D. Suresh Babu under the Suresh Productions banner and directed by K. Raghavendra Rao. It starred Venkatesh and Tabu , the latter making her first movie as an actress. Rao Gopal Rao, Sharada, Kota Srinivasa Rao, Paruchuri Venkateswara Rao, Mohan Babu, and Brahmanandam playing supporting roles. The music was composed by Ilaiyaraaja with cinematography by S. Gopal Reddy and editing by K. A. Martand. The film was dubbed into Tamil under the same title.

Plot
Ranjani is a proud woman and the daughter of Koteswara Rao, a multimillionaire in Singapore. Once when she was traveling towards Hyderabad in the train, she stops the train for her fallen lipstick, which leads to the death of Parvathamma. Raju is the Coolie No. 1 at Secunderabad Railway Station. He and Ranjani always have so many clashes between each other. Rajani calls her father from Singapore, and both of them implicate Raju in a rape case and send him to jail.

However, Raju is successful in escaping from jail. Due to Raju's threat, Koteswara Rao and Ranjani go to Singapore. Raju also reaches there with the help of Ranjani's mother Gruhalakshmi. Raju changes himself as Bharat and showcases himself as a big shot before Ranjani and makes her fall in love with him. Everyone agrees to their marriage, but Buchi Babu, Koteswara Rao's partner, and his son Gopal (Mohan Babu), who wants to marry Ranjani, find out that Bharat is none other than Raju. After the marriage completion, Raju reveals the truth. Everyone is shocked, Ranjani is disturbed, and she also throws away the holy Hindu wedding chain.

After that, everyone goes back to India, where Raju arranges their marriage reception. To overcome this problem, Koteswara Rao contacts local goon named Ranga Rao to stop the reception. He creates a big communal riot in Raju's colony, which leads to the deaths of many innocent people. In frustration and anger, Raju makes Ranjani pregnant by giving her sedation with her mother's help. She makes all possible attempts to remove the baby but fails. Finally, she decides to throw away the baby after giving birth.

Meanwhile, Ranga Rao, Buchi Babu, and Gopal try to kill Koteswara Rao for his property, but Raju protects him, which makes him realize. Ranjani gives birth to the baby boy; even then she will not leave her arrogance, and throws away the child. Raju decides to leave her, and her fate goes away with the baby. In that anger, Gruhalakshmi reveals Ranjani's past that she is not their own daughter, but the daughter of a railway coolie, and the woman who died in the beginning due to her negligence is her own mother. Listening to this, Ranjani admits her mistake. At the same time, Ranga Rao, Buchi Babu, and Gopal all beat Raju very badly, kidnap the baby, and blackmail Ranjani for her entire property documents. Ranjani runs towards Raju's help and apologises to him by falling down at his feet. Finally, Raju protects the baby and eliminates all the baddies. The movie ends with Raju and Ranjani's remarriage.

Cast

 Venkatesh as Raju / Bharat
 Tabu as Ranjani
 Rao Gopal Rao as Koteswara Rao
 Sarada as Gruhalakshmi
 Kota Srinivasa Rao as Ranga Rao
 Paruchuri Venkateswara Rao as Buchi Babu
 Mohan Babu as Gopal
 Brahmanandam as Nagoji
 Babu Mohan as S. I.
 Dubbing Janaki as Parvathamma
 Nirmalamma as Sarojamma
 Rallapalli as Lawyer Sripathi
 Gautam Raju as Coolie
 Jenny as Passenger
 Bangalore Padma as Coolie
 Rajitha as Lalitha
 Mada as T. C.

Soundtrack 
Music was composed by Ilaiyaraaja and lyrics written by Sirivennela Seetharama Sastry.  Music released on LEO Audio company. The song "Kotha Kothaga"  is based on "Pudhiya Poovithu", composed by Ilaiyaraaja for the Tamil film Thendrale Ennai Thodu (1985). The single "Attention Everybody" is reprised by Raja Kumari, in a tribute to Venkatesh by actor Rana Daggubati's South Bay channel in 2020.

References

External links
 

1991 films
Films directed by K. Raghavendra Rao
Films scored by Ilaiyaraaja
1990s Telugu-language films
Suresh Productions films